Carlos Vladimiro Corach (born 24 April 1935) is an Argentinian politician and lawyer, who served as Minister of Interior during the presidency of Carlos Menem between January 1995 and the end of tenure of Menem in December 1999.

He is Jewish and was investigated for his connection with AMIA bombing. After Menem's presidency, he was National Senator in 1999 until 2001.

References

1934 births
Ministers of Internal Affairs of Argentina
Argentine politicians
Living people